Dukey Treats is the thirtieth studio album by American keyboardist and record producer George Duke. It was released on August 26, 2008, through BPM Records under exclusive license to Heads Up International.

Track listing

Personnel 
 George Duke – vocals (tracks: 1-11), Rhodes piano (tracks: 1, 2, 5, 6, 9-12), clavinet (tracks: 1, 2, 4, 6), synthesizer (tracks: 1-4, 6-7, 9-12), narration (track 3), vibes (track 5), piano (tracks: 7, 9, 11), keyboards (track 8), producer, executive producer

 Josie James – vocals (tracks: 1, 2, 4, 8)
 Lori Perry – vocals (tracks: 1, 8)
 Rachelle Ferrell – vocals (tracks: 1, 9)
 Jim Gilstrap – vocals (tracks: 2, 9)
 Dee Dee Foster – vocals (track 2)
 Lynn Davis – vocals (tracks: 4, 6)
 Napoleon Murphy Brock – vocals (tracks: 4, 6)
 Kenya Hathaway – vocals (track 8)
 Howard Hewett – vocals (track 8)
 Christian McBride – vocals & upright bass (track 8)
 Jonathan Butler – vocals (track 10)
 Teena Marie – vocals (track 10)
 Terry Dexter – vocals (track 11)
 Lynne Fiddmont – vocals (track 11)
 Frederick C. White – backing vocals (tracks: 1-11)
 Jef Lee Johnson – guitar (tracks: 1, 2, 4-6, 8-10, 12)
 John "Jubu" Smith – guitar (tracks: 5, 7, 11)
 Ray Fuller – guitar (tracks: 5, 9)
 Wah Wah Watson – guitar (track 6)
 Michael Manson – bass (tracks: 2, 10, 12)
 Byron Lee Miller – bass (tracks: 4, 6)
 Larry Kimpel – bass (tracks: 5, 9, 11)
 Wyman Tisdale – bass (track 9)
 Ronald Bruner, Jr. – drums (tracks: 2, 10, 12)
 Leon "Ndugu" Chancler – drums (tracks: 4, 6)
 Vinnie Colaiuta – drums (tracks: 5, 7)
 John Roberts – drums (track 8)
 Teddy Campbell – drums (tracks: 9, 11)
 Sheila Escovedo – percussion (tracks: 1, 4, 6, 11)
 Lenny Castro – percussion (tracks: 5, 7)
 Everette Harp – alto saxophone (tracks: 1, 2, 4, 6, 11, 12)
 Dan Higgins – tenor saxophone (tracks: 1, 2, 11)
 Larry Williams – tenor saxophone (tracks: 4, 6, 12)
 Kamasi Washington – tenor saxophone (track 6)
 Reginald C. Young – trombone (tracks: 1, 2, 11)
 Isley Remington – trombone (tracks: 4, 6, 12)
 Michael "Patches" Stewart – trumpet (tracks: 1, 2, 4-6, 11, 12)
 Erik Zobler – engineering, mastering
 Thai Long Ly – assistant engineering
 Dave Love – executive producer
 Corine Duke – production coordinator
 Randall Moses – art direction
 Bobby Holland – photography

Chart history

References

External links 

Dukey Treats by George Duke on iTunes

2008 albums
George Duke albums
Heads Up International albums
Albums produced by George Duke